Rahmoun or Rahmoune may refer to:

 Mohamed Rahmoune, an Algerian politician
 Ouled Rahmoun, a commune in Algeria
 Oulad Rahmoune, a commune in Morocco